Greece competed at the 2018 Winter Olympics in Pyeongchang, South Korea, from 9 to 25 February 2018, with four competitors in two sports. As the founding nation of the Olympic games and in keeping with tradition, Greece entered first during the opening ceremony.

Competitors
The following is the list of number of competitors participating in the delegation per sport.

Alpine skiing 

Greece qualified two alpine skiers, one male and one female.

Cross-country skiing 

Greece qualified two athletes, one male and one female.

Distance

Sprint

See also
Greece at the 2018 Summer Youth Olympics

References

Nations at the 2018 Winter Olympics
2018
2018 in Greek sport